Max Jammer (מקס ימר; born Moshe Jammer, ; April 13, 1915 – December 18, 2010), was an Israeli physicist and philosopher of physics. He was born in Berlin, Germany. He was Rector and Acting President at Bar-Ilan University from 1967 to 1977.

Biography
Jammer studied physics, philosophy and history of science, first at the University of Vienna, and then from 1935 at the Hebrew University of Jerusalem, where he received a PhD in experimental physics in 1942. He served in the British Army for the rest of the war.

Jammer then returned to Hebrew University, where he lectured on the history and philosophy of science, before moving in 1952 to Harvard University. He subsequently became a lecturer there and a close colleague of Albert Einstein at Princeton University. He taught at Harvard, the University of Oklahoma, and Boston University, before in 1956 establishing the Department and becoming Professor of Physics at Bar-Ilan University in Israel.

He was Rector and Acting President (succeeding Joseph H. Lookstein, and succeeded by Emanuel Rackman) at Bar-Ilan University from 1967 to 1977. He also co-founded the Institute for Philosophy of Science at Tel Aviv University, and was president of the Association for the Advancement for Science in Israel. He was Visiting Professor at the Swiss Federal Institute of Technology in Zürich, the University of Göttingen, the Institut Henri Poincaré, Columbia University, the Catholic University of America in Washington, D. C., and other universities in the United States and Canada.

He is the father of Rabbi Michael Yammer, Rosh Yeshiva, Yeshivat Shaalvim.

Awards
Awards received by Jammer include:
 the 1984 Israel Prize, awarded for history of science;
 the 2003 EMET Prize awarded by the Prime Minister of Israel;
 the 2007 Abraham Pais Prize for History of Physics, awarded by the American Physical Society;
 the Monograph Prize of the American Academy of Arts and Sciences; and
 a prize for 'an outstanding book on theology and natural sciences' from the Templeton Foundation.

Selected publications

 Concepts of Space: The History of Theories of Space in Physics. Cambridge (Mass): Harvard University Press, 1954; New York: Harper, 1960; 2nd ed: Cambridge: Harvard U.P., 1969; 3rd ed: New York: Dover, 1993. . (Foreword by Albert Einstein)
 Concepts of Force: A Study in the Foundations of Dynamics. Cambridge (Mass): Harvard U.P., 1957 New York: Harper, 1962 New York: Dover, 1999. 
 Concepts of Mass in Classical and Modern Physics. Cambridge (Mass): Harvard U.P., 1961 New York: Harper, 1964 New York: Dover, 1997. 
 Concepts of Mass in Contemporary Physics and Philosophy. Princeton, N.J.: Princeton U.P., 2000. 
 The Conceptual Development of Quantum Mechanics. New York: McGraw-Hill, 1966  2nd ed: New York: American Institute of Physics, 1989. 
 The Philosophy of Quantum Mechanics: The Interpretations of Quantum Mechanics in Historical Perspective. New York: Wiley-Interscience, 1974. 
 Einstein and Religion: Physics and Theology. Princeton, N.J.: Princeton University Press, 1999.  hardbound.  paperback
 Concepts of Simultaneity: From Antiquity to Einstein and Beyond. Baltimore: Johns Hopkins U.P., 2006.

See also
 List of Israel Prize recipients

References

External links
 Max Jammer, 2007 Abraham Pais Prize for History of Physics Recipient, American Physical Society, Prizes, Awards & Fellowships. APS

1915 births
2010 deaths
Israeli physicists
Historians of physics
Philosophers of cosmology
Israel Prize in history of science recipients
Israel Prize in exact science recipients
EMET Prize recipients in the Humanities
University of Vienna alumni
Hebrew University of Jerusalem alumni
Harvard University faculty
Princeton University faculty
Academic staff of Bar-Ilan University
University of Oklahoma faculty
Boston University faculty
Columbia University faculty
Catholic University of America faculty
Jewish physicists
Jewish emigrants from Nazi Germany to Mandatory Palestine
Presidents of universities in Israel
British Army personnel of World War II